Kirribilli ferry wharf is located on the northern side of Sydney Harbour serving the Sydney suburb of Kirribilli. It is served by Sydney Ferries Neutral Bay services operating between Circular Quay and Neutral Bay. The single wharf is served by First Fleet class ferries.

Wharves & services

Connections
Busways operates one route to and from Kirribilli wharf:
269: to McMahons Point wharf

References

External links

Kirribilli Wharf at Transport for New South Wales (Archived 12 June 2019)
Kirribilli Local Area Map Transport for NSW

Ferry wharves in Sydney
Kirribilli